Wu Geng or Wugeng (Chinese:  Wǔgēng), a.k.a.  Lùfù, was an ancient Chinese noble who was the son of Zhou, the last king of the Shang. After his father executed Bigan by cutting out his heart, Wugeng fled to Feng, the capital of the Zhou state, together with his uncles Weizi and Weizhong to plead King Wu of Zhou for help. Shortly afterward King Wu attacked the Shang and defeated King Zhou at the Battle of Muye, thus establishing the Zhou dynasty. Wugeng was allowed to stay in Yin, the old Shang capital, and rule it as a princedom and a vassal lord to King Wu.

After King Wu's death and the ascension of his young son Cheng, Wugeng joined the failed rebellion of the Three Guards against the regent Duke of Zhou. He in turn was joined by the "Eastern Barbarian" states of Yan, Pugu, and Xu. In the second year of the war, Wugeng was killed in battle and Yin was devastated, ending the Shang princedom.

In popular culture
Wu Geng's life after the fall of Shang was fictionalized in manhuas titled Feng Shen Ji and Feng Shen Ji II. The former manhua focuses on Wu Geng's battle against the gods who supported Zhou, using the body of a slave he humiliated and blinded, when his mother extracted his soul out to fake his death. The latter covers  further fighting against gods. An animated adaptation entitled Wu Geng Ji started airing in 2016.

Zhou dynasty people